Chernyakhovsk, formerly known as Insterburg until 1946, is a town in Kaliningrad Oblast, Russia, and the administrative center of Chernyakhovsky District. Located at the confluence of the Instruch and Angrapa rivers, which unite to become the Pregolya river below Chernyakhovsk, the town had a population in 2017 of 36,423.

History
Insterburg was founded in 1336 by the Teutonic Knights on the site of a former Old Prussian fortification when Dietrich von Altenburg, the Grand Master of the Teutonic Knights, built a castle called Insterburg following the Prussian Crusade. During the Teutonic Knights' Northern Crusades campaign against the Grand Duchy of Lithuania, the town was devastated in 1376. The castle had been rebuilt as the seat of a Procurator and a settlement also named Insterburg grew up to serve it. In 1454, Polish King Casimir IV Jagiellon incorporated the region to the Kingdom of Poland upon the request of the anti-Teutonic Prussian Confederation. During the subsequent Thirteen Years' War (1454–1466) between Poland and the Teutonic Knights, the settlement was devastated by Polish troops in 1457. After the war, since 1466, the settlement was a part of Poland as a fief held by the Teutonic Knights.

When the Prussian Duke Albert of Brandenburg-Ansbach in 1525 secularized the monastic State of the Teutonic Order per the Treaty of Kraków, Insterburg became part of the Duchy of Prussia, a vassal duchy of the Kingdom of Poland. The settlement was granted town privileges on 10 October 1583 by the Prussian regent Margrave George Frederick. Insterburg became part of the Kingdom of Prussia in 1701, and because the area had been depopulated by plague in the early 18th century, King Frederick William I of Prussia invited Protestant refugees who had been expelled from the Archbishopric of Salzburg to settle in Insterburg in 1732. During the Seven Years' War, the town was occupied by Russia. During the Napoleonic Wars, French troops passed through the town in 1806, 1807, 1811 and 1813.

In 1818, after the Napoleonic Wars, the town became the seat of Insterburg District within the Gumbinnen Region. Michael Andreas Barclay de Tolly died at Insterburg in 1818 on his way from his Livonian manor to Germany, where he wanted to renew his health. In 1863, a Polish secret organization was founded and operated in Insterburg, which was involved in arms trafficking to the Russian Partition of Poland during the January Uprising. Since May 1864, the leader of the organization was Józef Racewicz.

Insterburg became a part of the German Empire following the 1871 unification of Germany, and on May 1, 1901, it became an independent city separate from Insterburg District. During World War I the Russian Army seized Insterburg on 24 August 1914, but it was retaken by Germany on 11 September 1914. The Weimar Germany era after World War I saw the town separated from the rest of the country as the province of East Prussia had become an exclave. The association football club Yorck Boyen Insterburg was formed in 1921. During World War II, the Germans operated the Stalag 336 prisoner-of-war camp for Allied POWs in the town. The town was heavily bombed by the British Royal Air Force on July 27, 1944. The town was stormed by Red Army troops on January 21–22, 1945. As part of the northern part of East Prussia, Insterburg was transferred from Germany to the Soviet Union after the war as previously agreed between the victorious powers at the Potsdam Conference. On 7 April 1946, Insterburg was renamed as Chernyakhovsk in honor of the Soviet World War II Army General, Ivan Chernyakhovsky, who commanded the army that first entered East Prussia in 1944.

After 1989, a group of people introduced the Akhal-Teke horse breed to the area and opened an Akhal-Teke breeding stable.

Administrative and municipal status
Within the framework of administrative divisions, Chernyakhovsk serves as the administrative center of Chernyakhovsky District. As an administrative division, it is, together with five rural localities, incorporated within Chernyakhovsky District as the town of district significance of Chernyakhovsk. As a municipal division, the town of district significance of Chernyakhovsk is incorporated within Chernyakhovsky Municipal District as Chernyakhovskoye Urban Settlement.

Population trends

Military
Chernyakhovsk is home to the Chernyakhovsk naval air facility.

Coat of arms controversy 
On September 2019 the local court ruled that the coat of arms was illegal because it carries "elements of foreign culture." The local court alleged that Russian laws do not allow the use of foreign languages and symbols in Russian state symbols and ordered the town "to remove any violations of the law."

The town's coat of arms, adopted in 2002, was based on the historic coat of arms of the town that before 1946 was known under its original Prussian name – Insterburg.

The full version of coat of arms in question has a picture of a Prussian man with a horn and the Latin initials G.F. for the Regent of Prussia George Frederick, margrave of Brandenburg-Ansbach (1543–1603), who gave Insterburg the status of town and with it his family coat of arms.

The case brought before the court follows a trend among several towns in the region that have announced their intentions to change their coat of arms as tensions mount between Russia and the West following the annexation of Crimea by the Russian Federation in 2014 and its support for pro-Russian separatists in eastern Ukraine.

Notable people
Martin Grünberg (1665–c.1706), architect
Johann Otto Uhde (1725–1766), composer and violinist
Johann Friedrich Goldbeck (1748–1812), geographer and Protestant theologian
Eduard Heinrich von Flottwell (1786–1865), politician
Carl Friedrich Wilhelm Jordan (1819–1904), writer and politician
Ernst Wichert (1831–1902), author
Edward Frederick Moldenke (1836–1904) Lutheran theologian and missionary
Hans Horst Meyer (1853–1939),  pharmacologist
Therese Malten (1855–1930), opera singer
Paul Gerhard Neumann (1911–1986), physical oceanographer
Hans Orlowski (1894–1967) woodcut artist and painter
Hans Otto Erdmann (1896–1944), member of the German resistance to Nazism
Fritz Karl Preikschat (1910–1994), engineer and inventor
Kurt Kuhlmey (1913–1993), Bundeswehr major general
Kurt Plenzat (1914–1998), military officer
Traugott Buhre (1929–2009), actor
Harry Boldt (born 1930), Olympic champion in dressage
 Anatol Herzfeld (1931–2019), German sculptor and mixed media artist
Jürgen Schmude (born 1936), politician (SPD)
Hans-Jürgen Quadbeck-Seeger (born 1939), chemist
Anatole Klyosov (born 1946) a scientist in physical chemistry, enzyme catalysis and industrial biochemistry.
Yuri Vasenin (1948–2022) Soviet football player and Russian coach.

Twin towns and sister cities

Chernyakhovsk is twinned with:
 Brzeg Dolny, Poland
 Grudziądz, Poland
 Kirchheimbolanden, Germany, since 2002
 Marijampolė, Lithuania
 Węgorzewo, Poland, since 1996

References

Notes

Sources

External links

Official website of Chernyakhovsk 
Chernyakhovsk Business Directory 
Unofficial website of Chernyakhovsk 

Cities and towns in Kaliningrad Oblast
Populated places established in the 1330s
Castles of the Teutonic Knights
Castles in Russia
Chernyakhovsky District